The 1992 State of the Union Address was given by the 41st president of the United States, George H. W. Bush, on January 28, 1992, at 9:00 p.m. EST, in the chamber of the United States House of Representatives to the 102nd United States Congress. It was Bush's third and final State of the Union Address and his fourth and final speech to a joint session of the United States Congress. Presiding over this joint session was the House speaker, Tom Foley, accompanied by Dan Quayle, the vice president, in his capacity as the president of the Senate.

This was the last State of the Union address by President Bush, who lost his re-election bid to Bill Clinton in the 1992 election.

The president discussed the collapse of the Soviet Union, Operation Desert Storm, military spending cuts, nuclear disarmament, economic recovery (high unemployment remained from the early 1990s recession), several types of tax cuts and credits, and controlling government spending. Bush listed a nine-point, long-term plan advocating:

 free trade
 school choice
 research and development tax credits and emerging technologies funding
 anti-crime legislation
 inner city development
 privatized health care reform
 reduction of the federal budget deficit
 Congress to act on various existing reform proposals
 efforts to strengthen families

Seeing increased division in American media and politics, Bush denounced election-year partisanship and described the popular sentiment as a passing mood.

The speech lasted 51 minutes and consisted of 5,012 words.

The Democratic Party response was delivered by the Speaker of the House, Representative Tom Foley of Washington. Foley, speaking for 12 minutes, criticized Bush's economic recovery plans as being the same as those that led to the recession and argued for more support of the middle class instead of wealthier Americans.

Edward Madigan, the Secretary of Agriculture, served as the designated survivor.

See also
1992 United States presidential election

References

External links
(full transcript), The American Presidency Project, UC Santa Barbara.
(full video and audio), Miller Center of Public Affairs, University of Virginia.
Transcript of the Democratic Party response, New York Times
1992 State of the Union Address (video) at C-SPAN
1992 State of the Union Response (video) at C-SPAN

State Union 1992
State of the Union addresses
102nd United States Congress
State of the Union Address
State of the Union Address
State of the Union Address
January 1992 events in the United States